The 1998 Sam Houston State Bearkats football team represented Sam Houston State University as a member of the Southland Conference during the 1998 NCAA Division I-AA football season. Led by 17th-year head coach Ron Randleman, the Bearkats compiled an overall record of 3–8 with a mark of 1–6 in conference play, and finished eighth in the Southland.

Schedule

References

Sam Houston State
Sam Houston Bearkats football seasons
Sam Houston State Bearkats football